Madison County is a county located in the U.S. state of Arkansas. As of the 2020 census, the population was 16,521. The county seat is Huntsville. The county was formed on September 30, 1836, and named for Madison County, Alabama, the home of some early settlers. They also named the county seat after Madison County in Alabama's county seat, Huntsville.

Madison County is part of the Northwest Arkansas region.

Geography

Adjacent counties
Carroll County (north)
Newton County (east)
Johnson County (southeast)
Franklin County (south)
Crawford County (southwest)
Washington County (west)
Benton County (northwest)

National protected area
 Ozark National Forest (part)

Demographics

2020 census

As of the 2020 United States census, there were 16,521 people, 6,279 households, and 4,318 families residing in the county.

2000 census
As of the 2000 census, there were 14,243 people, 5,463 households, and 4,080 families residing in the county.  The population density was 7/km2 (17/mi2).  There were 6,537 housing units at an average density of 3/km2 (8/mi2).  The racial makeup of the county was 95.94% White, 0.11% Black or African American, 1.22% Native American, 0.06% Asian, 0.09% Pacific Islander, 1.47% from other races, and 1.10% from two or more races.  3.06% of the population were Hispanic or Latino of any race.

There were 5,463 households, out of which 33.90% had children under the age of 18 living with them, 63.00% were married couples living together, 7.90% had a female householder with no husband present, and 25.30% were non-families. 22.40% of all households were made up of individuals, and 10.40% had someone living alone who was 65 years of age or older.  The average household size was 2.59 and the average family size was 3.03.

In the county, the population was spread out, with 26.80% under the age of 18, 7.50% from 18 to 24, 27.00% from 25 to 44, 24.30% from 45 to 64, and 14.40% who were 65 years of age or older.  The median age was 38 years. For every 100 females, there were 99.70 males.  For every 100 females age 18 and over, there were 97.30 males.

The median income for a household in the county was $27,895, and the median income for a family was $32,910. Males had a median income of $24,911 versus $18,786 for females. The per capita income for the county was $14,736.  About 14.70% of families and 18.60% of the population were below the poverty line, including 24.60% of those under age 18 and 18.00% of those age 65 or over.

Government
During the Secession Convention of 1861, Arkansas voted to leave the Union and join the Confederate States of America. When Chairman David Walker called for a second vote seeking a unanimous decision, only Madison County representative Isaac Murphy refused to change his vote. Murphy would later be appointed Governor of Arkansas during Reconstruction under Abraham Lincoln's conciliatory policy.

Madison County is strongly Republican, and voted for the Republican candidate several times even when Arkansas was part of the "Solid South". A Democrat has only carried the county four times since 1940.

Transportation

Major highways
 U.S. Highway 412
 Highway 12
 Highway 16
 Highway 21
 Highway 23
 Highway 45
 Highway 74

Airport
The Huntsville Municipal Airport is a public-use airport located two nautical miles (4 km) southwest of the central business district of Huntsville.

Communities

City
Huntsville (county seat)

Towns
Hindsville
St. Paul

Unincorporated communities

Delaney
Kingston
Marble
Clifty
Forum
Weathers
Witter
Japton
Combs
Pettigrew
Wesley
Aurora

Townships

Notable residents
Orval E. Faubus (1910–1994), governor of Arkansas during the desegregation days, was from the Combs community near Huntsville.  He is buried in Combs Cemetery.
Ronnie Hawkins, rockabilly singer. His backing band, The Hawks, later played with Bob Dylan and eventually became The Band.
Danny L. Patrick, Republican member of the Arkansas House of Representatives from Madison and Carroll counties from 1967 to 1970.
John Selman, outlaw and lawman, best known for killing John Wesley Hardin in 1895, was born in Madison County.
Charles Whorton Jr., Democrat Member of the Arkansas House of Representatives 1991 to1998, Madison County Judge 1973 to 1988, Madison County Clerk 1955 to 1972

See also
List of lakes in Madison County, Arkansas
 National Register of Historic Places listings in Madison County, Arkansas

References

External links
 Madison County Map (U. S. Census Bureau)
 Official Site

 
Northwest Arkansas
1836 establishments in Arkansas
Populated places established in 1836